Francis H. Schell (1834–1909) was an American artist, illustrator, and lithographer, active in Philadelphia and New York. Many of his works appeared in Frank Leslie's Illustrated Newspaper, where he headed the art department, the Century, and several other publications.

References

External links 
Francis H. Schell (1834-1909), The Becker Collection

1834 births
1909 deaths
American illustrators
American lithographers